The Vennones or Vennonetes were a Rhaetian tribe dwelling in the northern Alps, between Chur and Lake Constance, during the Iron Age and the Roman era.

Name 
They are mentioned as Ouénnōnes (Οὐέννωνες) by Strabo (early 1st c. AD), as Vennonenses (var. -) by Pliny (1st c. AD), and as Ouénnōnetes (Οὐέννωνετες) by Ptolemy (2nd c. AD).

The etymology of the name remains obscure. If Celtic, and not Rhaetic, it could be derived from the root - ('friend'), with a sound shift -n- > -nn- attested in other cases (e.g. Vena / Venna), or else from to - (< *-), meaning 'chariot'.

Geography 
The Vennones dwelled in the northern Alps, between Chur and Lake Constance. Their territory was located north of the Calucones, west of the Estiones, Focunates and Genaunes, south of the Brigantii.

Pliny described the Vennones and Sarunetes as "Rhaetian tribes living near the sources of the river Rhine".

History 
They were subjugated by the Roman forces of Publius Silius Nerva in 16 BC.

The Vennonetes appear as the third tribe in the inscription on the Tropaeum Alpium. In the secondary tradition of the text by Pliny the Elder their position in the list was exchanged with the Venostes and the Vennonetes appear as the fourth tribe.

References

Primary sources

Bibliography 

Tribes conquered by Rome
Raetia
Ancient Switzerland